Rémilly may refer to the following places in France:

 Rémilly, Moselle, a commune in the Moselle department
 Rémilly, Nièvre, a commune in the Nièvre department

See also
 Remilly-Wirquin, a commune in the Pas-de-Calais department